Barakat (in Arabic بركات) is an Arabic surname. It is the plural form of Barakah (بركة) meaning blessing. 

Notable people with the surname include:
Adib Barakat (born 1982), Syrian footballer
Adnan Barakat (born 1982), Moroccan-Dutch footballer
Amin J. Barakat (born 1942), Lebanese-American physician
Diala Barakat (born 1980), Syrian politician
Fred Barakat (1939–2010), American basketball coach
Ghaleb Barakat (1927–2014), Jordanian politician and diplomat
Halim Barakat (born 1933), American writer
Hamada Barakat (born 1988), Moroccan writer
Henry Barakat (1912–1997), Egyptian film director
Hibat Allah Abu'l-Barakat al-Baghdaadi (1080s–1165), 12th-century philosopher and physicist
Hisham Barakat (1950–2015), Egyptian Prosecutor General
Hoda Barakat (born 1952), Lebanese writer
Ihsan Barakat (born 1964), first female Supreme Court judge in Jordan
Jack Barakat (born 1988), guitar player of pop punk band All Time Low
Melhem Barakat (born 1945), Lebanese singer-songwriter
Mohamed Barakat (born 1976), Egyptian footballer
Najwa Barakat (born 1966), Lebanese writer
Saleh Barakat, Lebanese art dealer
Salim Barakat (born 1951), Syrian writer and poet
Subhi Barakat (1889–1939), Syrian politician and Head of State of Syria From 1920-1925

Arabic-language surnames